Jacques-Marie-Adrien-Césaire Mathieu (1796–1875) was a French cardinal of the Roman Catholic Church. He was Bishop of Langres and was later consecrated as Archbishop of Besançon. Mathieu was elevated to Cardinal on 30 September 1850 by Pope Pius IX and became Cardinal-Priest of San Silvestro in Capite in 1852. He is also the author of "Devoirs Du Sacerdoce ou Traité de la Dignité, de la Perfection, des Obligations... du Prêtre Catholique".

References

External links
 Profile, catholic-hierarchy.org; accessed 4 May 2020.

1796 births
1875 deaths
19th-century French cardinals
Cardinals created by Pope Pius IX